Michael Palacio (born August 29, 1986 in Long Beach, New York) is an American soccer player.

Career

Youth and college
Palacio was a four-year letterwinner at center midfield at Long Beach High School where he holds school records for assists in a game, season and career. He was named first team all-state as a senior, three time all-county selection.  Michael also emerged from one of the top soccer clubs in the NY area Blau-Weiss Gottschee Soccer Club, at Gottschee he excelled and developed many of his future attributes in becoming a prolific attacking midfielder.

Palacio played college soccer at Stony Brook University under head coach Cesar Markovic. Palacio was a three-time selection on the All-America East First Team, and was named to the NSCAA All-Northeast Region Second Team in his junior season. He is the Stony Brook all-time leader in assists and was named the America East Midfielder of the Year in 2006 and also was instrumental in Stony Brook's run to the NCAA tournament in 2005, Michael led the team with 25 points 7 goals 11 assists.

During his college years Palacio also played with Fort Wayne Fever in the USL Premier Development League.

Professional
Palacio was drafted by New York Red Bulls in the second round, 21st overall, in the 2008 MLS Supplemental Draft, where he played alongside teammate from college Chris Megaloudis. Unfortunately, in a scrimmage match against New England Revolution he suffered a torn ACL making him miss the rest of the season. Following the surgeries (knee and appendix) and a 14-month recovery, Palacio signed with Long Island Rough Riders of the USL Premier Development League where he had the opportunity to show that his recovery was completed, scoring an additional 6 goals in 15 appearances in 2009

Following the end of the 2009 PDL season, Palacio, together with his Stony Brook teammate Petar Raković, traveled to Europe where, while preparing for trials with some clubs in Denmark and training in Serbia, he was invited to take part in a friendly game between Radnički Obrenovac and Serbian SuperLiga club OFK Belgrade. The match ended with a 1-1 draw, with Palacio scored his team's only goal, and the Obrenovac offered him a contract. Palacio played with Obrenovac throughout the 2009-2010 season, scoring 3 goals in 25 games, before returning to the United States in the summer of 2010.

After a brief stint playing for New York-based amateur club New York Pancyprian-Freedoms during their 2010 Lamar Hunt US Open Cup run, Palacio signed with Fort Lauderdale Strikers of the North American Soccer League on March 16, 2011.

Palacio signed with Carolina RailHawks of the NASL in January 2012.

Personal
Mike's father, Leo Palacio, was a former player at the University of North Carolina. Mike's younger brother Dylan was the national high school wrestling champion in his weight class in 2012.

References

External links

Career at Stony Brook University site
News from Rough Riders site
Roster at Rough Riders site
Profile at Red Bull NY official site
Profile at SrbijaFudbal

1986 births
Living people
American soccer players
American expatriate soccer players
Association football midfielders
Fort Wayne Fever players
New York Red Bulls players
Long Island Rough Riders players
Fort Lauderdale Strikers players
North Carolina FC players
Soccer players from New York (state)
USL League Two players
North American Soccer League players
Cosmopolitan Soccer League players
FK Radnički Obrenovac players
Expatriate footballers in Serbia
New York Red Bulls draft picks
New York Pancyprian-Freedoms players
Long Beach High School (New York) alumni
Nassau Lions men's soccer coaches